Timothy Neil Wren (born 26 March 1970) is an English former cricketer. He played for Kent between 1989 and 1997.

Wren was born in Folkestone, and attended the Harvey Grammar School.

References

1970 births
Living people
English cricketers
Kent cricketers
People from Folkestone
People educated at The Harvey Grammar School